La Red, is a private television channel in Chile. It began broadcasting on 12 May 1991, as the second private television station in Chile, after Mega.

From 1991 to 2014, the channel operated in facilities adjacent to the Chilefilms complex in Las Condes. In 2014, it opened its own production complex ubicated in Macul, which has three studios.

Programming
Among the many TV shows broadcast on La Red are:

See also :es:Anexo:Producciones de La Red#Programas actuales y de continuidad

Network
The channel was owned by several companies, such as TV Azteca and Copesa, before being sold to Mexican businessman Remigio Ángel González. The channel was called Red Television (Network Television) for about ten years until 2009, before being reverted to its original name in 2009. It mainly airs Hollywood blockbusters (especially in primetime). It is also the TV station that broadcast the local version of the popular "Big Brother" and WWE shows like WWE Raw and WWE SmackDown.

In audience share, it currently ranks fifth behind TVN, Canal 13, CHV, and Mega.

References

External links
 Official site 

 
Television networks in Chile
Television stations in Chile
Television channels and stations established in 1991
Spanish-language television stations
Companies based in Santiago
1991 establishments in Chile